Little Catalina is a town in the Canadian province of Newfoundland and Labrador. The town had a population of 458 in the Canada 2006 Census.

See also
 List of cities and towns in Newfoundland and Labrador

Former towns in Newfoundland and Labrador
Populated places in Newfoundland and Labrador
Trinity Bay North